Padandi Munduku: The Dandi March is a 1962 Telugu-language political thriller film directed by V. Madhusudhana Rao, and produced by Jaggayya. The film is touted to be the first Indian film based on the Salt March and India's independence movement as its core theme.

The ensemble cast film featured Kongara Jagayya, Jamuna, Gummadi, Ramana Reddy, Kanta Rao, G. Varalakshmi, K. V. S. Sarma, Hemalatha, Master Suresh and Krishna Ghattamaneni in his debut, V. Nagayya, S. V. Ranga Rao, C. S. R. Anjaneyulu,  Balakrishna, Peketi, Kamala Kumari, Jayanthi, and Rajasulochana in pivotal roles, while Indian wrestlers Ajith Singh and Sethi were also featured in guest roles.

The film received critical reception at the International Film Festival of India, the Tashkent Film Festival, and the 5th Moscow International Film Festival, including special mention from Russian Jury member Alexander Rou.

Plot
During 1920, the time of British Raj in Madras State a train accident separates freedom fighter couple Santhamma (G. Varalakshmi) and husband Dharmarao (K. V. S. Sarma). However, Santhamma survives and brings up her son Sathyadev (Jaggaiah) and adopts another son Arjun (Master Suresh), and inculcates in them Gandhiji's principles. Arjun participates in the 1930 Salt Satyagraha, kills a British officer, and flies the Indian tricolor flag. On the other hand, DSP Sankara Rao (Gummadi), the brother of Santhamma, working under the British administration, summons Santhamma for the act, and her son Arjun is imprisoned.

However, with the help of Sankara Rao's daughter Sarala (Jamuna) and her follower Vinayak (Ramana Reddy), Sathyadev rescues Arjun from a hospital where he is being treated. Dharmarao brings the grievously injured Sathyadev and Arjun home. However, his second wife's son Suresh (Kantharao) drives them to  Sankara Rao's house instead of the doctor's home. Sarala manages to free them from the home. Having identified themselves as vigilantes to Rao's wife, Sathyadev and Arjun take shelter at Rao's house without his knowledge, Rao's wife Parvathi (Hemalatha) realizes that Arjun is their lost child. When an unnerved Rao and a British official tries to take them into custody, Sathyadev and Arjun kill the corrupt British officer and escape. In the ensuing chase and shootout, Santhamma, who comes in between, succumbs to bullet injuries and dies. A repentant Rao resigns his job opposing the British raj's atrocities towards Indians and protests, with India attaining independence, Sathyadev and Arjun are released from the prison.

Production
V. Madhusudhana Rao helmed the production design for the film. The soundtrack and background score was composed by S. P. Kodandapani. The talkie part of the film was shot at Saradhi Studios, in Hyderabad, and crucial scenes were shot in Tenali in Andhra Pradesh with few retrospective scenes showcasing Gandhiji and Jawaharlal Nehru. The film was released during the republic day weekend of January 26, 1962, to positive reviews.

Soundtrack
 "Padandi Munduku Padandi Tosuku" (Lyrics: Sri Sri; Singers: Ghantasala, Madhavapeddi Satyam, A. P. Komala)
 "Manasu Manchidi Vayasu Cheddadi" (Lyrics: Aathreya; Singers: Ghantasala, P. Susheela)
 "Meluko Saagipo Bandhanalu Tenchuko" (Lyrics: Dasarathi; Singers: Ghantasala, Madhavapeddi Satyam, A. P. Komala)

References

1960s Telugu-language films
1962 films
Indian nonlinear narrative films
Films about rebellions
1960s action thriller films
Films set in the 1930s
Indian political thriller films
Indian films about revenge
Indian buddy films
Films set in Chennai
Films about social issues in India
Films about corruption in India
Cultural depictions of Mahatma Gandhi
Epic films based on actual events
Films set in the Indian independence movement
Indian vigilante films
Films directed by V. Madhusudhana Rao
Films scored by S. P. Kodandapani